is a retired Japanese badminton player who is a singles specialist from NTT East badminton club. She competed at the 2014 Asian Games.

Mitani expressed her desire to retire after losing in the second round of 73rd All Japan Comprehensive Championships on 28 November 2019, and officially announced her retirement on the first day of 2019 S/J League on 20 December.

Achievements

BWF World Championships 
Women's singles

BWF World Tour (2 titles) 
The BWF World Tour, which was announced on 19 March 2017 and implemented in 2018, is a series of elite badminton tournaments sanctioned by the Badminton World Federation (BWF). The BWF World Tours are divided into levels of World Tour Finals, Super 1000, Super 750, Super 500, Super 300 (part of the HSBC World Tour), and the BWF Tour Super 100.

Women's singles

BWF Superseries 
The BWF Superseries, which was launched on 14 December 2006 and implemented in 2007, is a series of elite badminton tournaments, sanctioned by the Badminton World Federation (BWF). BWF Superseries levels are Superseries and Superseries Premier. A season of Superseries consists of twelve tournaments around the world that have been introduced since 2011. Successful players are invited to the Superseries Finals, which are held at the end of each year.

Women's singles

  BWF Superseries Finals tournament
  BWF Superseries Premier tournament
  BWF Superseries tournament

BWF Grand Prix 
The BWF Grand Prix had two levels, the BWF Grand Prix and Grand Prix Gold. It was a series of badminton tournaments sanctioned by the Badminton World Federation (BWF) which was held from 2007 to 2017.

Women's singles

  BWF Grand Prix Gold tournament
  BWF Grand Prix tournament

BWF International Challenge/Series 
Women's singles

Women's doubles

  BWF International Challenge tournament
  BWF International Series tournament

Record against selected opponents 
Record against year-end Finals finalists, World Championships semi-finalists, and Olympic quarter-finalists. Accurate as of 20 August 2019.

References

External links 

 

1991 births
Living people
Sportspeople from Ishikawa Prefecture
Japanese female badminton players
Badminton players at the 2014 Asian Games
Asian Games bronze medalists for Japan
Asian Games medalists in badminton
Medalists at the 2014 Asian Games